Oba is a town in Nigeria. Its postal code is 434112.

It was formerly the headquarters of the Idemili South Local Government Area in Anambra State and lies approximately 7 kilometers south of Onitsha along the old Owerri-Onitsha Trunk A Road.

The first traditional King of Oba town was Igwe [[Peter Chukwuma Ezenwa( Eze Okpoko I of Oba). (1926-2018)

Geography
To the north is the Idemili River and the neighboring towns of Nkpor and Umuoji. To the south is the Ekulu River and the towns of Oraifite and Akwu-Ukwu. To the east are the towns of Ojoto and Ichi and to the west is the Ose River and the towns of Obosi and Odekpe.

Attractions
Oba has nine villages  which are Abime, Aborji, Ezelle, Isu, Ogbenwe, Ogwugwu, Okuzu, Umuogali and Urueze. Some of the notable places and sites of attraction include the Rojenny Games Village, Tansian University, Ogba Spring, Oba Airport (under construction), Afor Oba, hotels and banks. The town is strategically located, being sandwiched between the commercial city of Onitsha and the industrial city of Nnewi, both cities being less than five-minutes' drive from Oba. An international market (Anambra International Trade Centre) which was commissioned under the first democratic governor of Anambra state is currently under construction in Oba; when completed it would consist of 25,000 lock-up stores with modern amenities like fire service, schools, police posts, 24/7 power supply amongst others. It will also pride itself as the largest market in West Africa. Oba has turned into a modern urban town with a population of over 300,000 inhabitants. Oba is part of the Greater Onitsha City as designated by the United Nations.

The Biafran Republic army settled in Oba as their last frontier following the fall of Onitsha during the Nigeria Civil War. Oba was never in the hands of the Nigerian Army until the end of the war.

Oba was in the limelight during the lavish burial of Obi Iyiegbu's mother on 16 July 2021.

References

Populated places in Anambra State